Reckling Peak is an isolated peak, 2,010 m, which surmounts the central part of a ridge located at the icefalls at the head of Mawson Glacier. Mapped by United States Geological Survey (USGS) from ground surveys and Navy air photos. Named by Advisory Committee on Antarctic Names (US-ACAN) in 1964 for Lieutenant Commander Darold L. Reckling, pilot with U.S. Navy Squadron VX-6, 1961.

Reckling Moraine is located 8 nautical miles (15 km) east of the peak, and is connected by a long narrow patch of bare ice.
 

Mountains of Oates Land